Rufus Giwa Polytechnic is a tertiary learning institution in Owo, Ondo State, Nigeria. The National Board for Technical Education has approved it as a state-owned polytechnic.
It is also accredited by the Institute of Chartered Accountants of Nigeria.

The polytechnic was established by edict in 1979 with the name The Polytechnic, Owo by the outgoing Military Governor Sunday Tuoyo. Executive Governor Adekunle Ajasin began to operate the polytechnic immediately he took office in early 1980. It was renamed Ondo State Polytechnic in 1990. By 2010 the polytechnic had over 4,000 students.

The polytechnic has several department in the Faculties of Engineering, Science and Technology, LEMS, etc. It has a mandate of training and developing techniques in Applied Science, Engineering, Environmental Studies, Accounting, Commerce and Home Economics.

Rufus Giwa Polytechnic had the following rectors: Mr Olusegun Arodudu, Dr Adeyeri, Prof Adedimila, Mr Alao, Mr Ogundowole, Prof Peter Fapetu, prof ajibefun, Engr Ologunagba and Mr Gani Ogundahunsi who is presently the Rector.

In June 2003 the polytechnic was renamed after Chief Rufus Folusho Giwa, a prominent businessman from Ondo who had become president of the Manufacturers Association of Nigeria (MAN). 
Students protested the change of name and the school was shut down, only reopening on 29 September 2003. 
In July 2009 the polytechnic closed down due to a strike by the staff over non-payment of 10 months monetization arrears. 
In February 2010, Ondo State Governor Olusegun Mimiko inaugurated a 16-person governing council for the polytechnic.
In March 2010, Mimiko said that his government had paid the monetisation arrears of N210 million owed to the polytechnic.

Gallery

See also
Achievers University
Federal Medical Centre
List of polytechnics in Nigeria

References

External links

 
1979 establishments in Nigeria
Educational institutions established in 1979
Polytechnics in Nigeria
Universities and colleges in Ondo State